Jazz is a style of music and its subgenres.

Jazz may also refer to:

Computing
 Jazz (computer), a development platform used by Microsoft
 Jazz (mobile network operator), a mobile network operator in Pakistan
 IBM Jazz, a team collaboration platform
 Lotus Jazz, a spreadsheet program for Macintosh

Literature
 Jazz (magazine) or Jazz & Pop, a 1962–1972 magazine
 Jazz (manga), a Japanese comic book
 Jazz (novel), a 1992 novel by Toni Morrison
 Jazz (Henri Matisse), a book collecting pochoir prints based on cut-outs by Henri Matisse
 Jazz (picture book), a 2006 children's book by Walter Dean Myers, illustrated by Christopher Myers
 Jazz Magazine, a French magazine about jazz, founded 1954

Music
 Jazz, Ltd., a Dixieland jazz band, nightclub, and record label in Chicago
 Jazz (singer), member of Black Buddafly
 Jazz (Ry Cooder album) (1978)
 Jazz (John Handy album) (1962)
 Jazz (Queen album) (1978)
 Jazz (Wallace Roney album) (2007)
 Jazz (Tenacious D EP) (2012)
 Jazz (Casey Abrams album), (2019)
 "Jazz (We've Got)", a song by A Tribe Called Quest from The Low End Theory

Sports
 Jazz (wrestler) or Carlene Begnaud (born 1973), professional wrestler
 Utah Jazz, NBA basketball team in Salt Lake City, Utah
 FC Jazz, a Finnish association football team

Other uses
 Jazz (airline), an airline in Canada
 Jazz (apple)
 Jazz (design), a design introduced on disposable cups in 1992
 Jazz (Kanso series), a 1979 series of paintings by Nabil Kanso
 Jazz (Italian EMU), Italian Electric multiple units (EMU) used for commuter regional trains
 Jazz (perfume), a fragrance by Yves Saint Laurent
 Jazz (soft drink), a soda product from Pepsi-Cola
 Jazz (TV series), a 2001 documentary produced by Ken Burns for PBS
 Jazz (Transformers), a robot superhero character
 Jazz (word), etymology and usage
 Honda Jazz or Honda Fit, a hatchback
 Pro-Design Jazz, an Austrian paraglider design

People with the name
 Jazz Carlin (born 1990), Welsh competitive swimmer
 Jazz Cartier (born 1993), Canadian rapper
 Jazz Gillum (1904–1966), American blues harmonica player
 Jazz Guignard (active 1930s), Haitian jazz musician
 Jazz Hamilton (born 1965), Puerto Rican saxophonist
 Jazz Janewattananond (born 1995), Thai professional golfer
 Jazz Jennings (born 2000), American LGBTQ rights activist
 Jazz Ocampo (born 1997), Filipina actress and model
 Jazz Raycole (born 1988), American actress and dancer
 Jazz Richards (born 1991), Welsh footballer
 Jazz Summers (1944–2015), British music manager
 Jazz Tevaga (born 1995), New Zealand rugby league player

Fictional
 Jazz Curtis, a character from Home and Away
 Jazz Fenton, an animated character from Nickelodeon's Danny Phantom

See also
 Jahss, Boxer's fracture
 Jazz dance
 Larry "Jazz" Anthony (born 1977), American R&B singer